Luis Gibert (3 March 1903 – 24 January 1979) was a Spanish water polo player. He competed at the 1920 Summer Olympics and the 1924 Summer Olympics.

See also
 Spain men's Olympic water polo team records and statistics
 List of men's Olympic water polo tournament goalkeepers

References

External links
 

1903 births
1979 deaths
Spanish male water polo players
Water polo goalkeepers
Olympic water polo players of Spain
Water polo players at the 1920 Summer Olympics
Water polo players at the 1924 Summer Olympics
Water polo players from Barcelona